Helixocerus is a genus of flies in the family Dolichopodidae. It is known from New Caledonia, American Samoa and Western Samoa.

Species
 Helixocerus koghis Bickel, 2002
 Helixocerus mendosus Lamb, 1929

References 

Dolichopodidae genera
Sciapodinae
Insects of New Caledonia
Invertebrates of American Samoa
Fauna of Samoa